Three Christs, also known as State of Mind, is a 2017 American drama film directed, co-produced, and co-written by Jon Avnet and based on Milton Rokeach's nonfiction book The Three Christs of Ypsilanti. It screened in the Gala Presentations section at the 2017 Toronto International Film Festival. The film is also known as: Three Christs of Ypsilanti, The Three Christs of Ypsilanti, Three Christs of Santa Monica, and The Three Christs of Santa Monica.

Plot
Dr Alan Stone, a progressive and idealistic psychologist, dropped out of New York University in 1954 to work directly with patients at the Ypsilanti State Mental Asylum. Stone, whose focus is on schizophrenic patients, is widely considered a critic of the system. In the 1950s, people with mental illnesses were mostly only kept in institutions and sedated when needed. Treatments with insulin shock therapy and the use of electric shocks were common, while talk therapy was only a marginal phenomenon.

In Ypsilanti, Stone meets two patients who both believe they are Jesus Christ: the short intellectual Joseph Cassell and the gruff Clyde Benson. Out of this coincidence, the psychologist develops a format of group talk therapy. He has another patient transferred to Ypsilanti who also believes he is Christ, Leon Gabor, and brings the three men together to study their behavior. He finds out that the problems of the three are completely different. Gabor suffered all his life from his deeply religious mother, and he was also traumatized by multiple rapes by a man he had been exposed to as a soldier. Benson couldn't cope with the death of his beloved wife from an abortion. Cassell is prone to outbursts of anger. Once admitted to the institution, he was repeatedly sedated with electric shocks, which he subsequently developed a great fear of because he feared for his sanity. Contrary to the skepticism of many colleagues, including the head of the institution, Dr. Orbus, Stone takes a different course and, for example, completely dispenses with physical punishment. In fact, he manages to get through to the patients by talking to them and writing them letters.

When he makes the cover of a professional journal with his new approach, it arouses the envy of Dr. Orbus, who wants a share of the fame and henceforth urges to be involved in the treatment. Since Stone reacts reservedly to Orbus's obvious craving for prestige, the latter finally bypasses the colleague and lets Cassell be taken alone to his office for an interview. It is revealed that Stone wrote the letters to Cassell on Orbus' behalf, since the head of the asylum originally declined the task. Cassell feels betrayed by Stone and stalled by Orbus. Despite good behavior, he sees his hopes of leaving the clinic dwindling. Out of anger at this realization, he becomes abusive again, which is why Orbus orders renewed electric shocks for him. Stone rushes over and tries to stop it, but is ultimately unable to prevent the shocks. In a skirmish with another doctor, he injures him and himself. Orbus then has him expelled from the institution.

Orbus takes over his patients. Cassell, however, who noticed that Stone wanted to save him and also that he then disappeared, no longer trusts Orbus. He sees himself in his power and believes in another long suffering. Finally, during a conversation in the chapel's bell tower with Orbus, he jumps out of the window and dies.

In the later hearing, Stone accused Orbus of making negligent decisions. He also deciphers Cassell's last words, according to which Cassell not only committed suicide to be free, but above all gave his life to justify the sins of Orbus as Jesus did the sins of mankind. The hearing ends with Stone being fired. However, he is granted permission and funds to continue his study, including the two remaining patients, in New York. Orbus, on the other hand, remains formally in his post, but without decision-making powers until his retirement. The film closes with a summary. Although Stone's therapeutic approach ultimately did not prove to be effective, it would have helped him himself. In the final scene, Stone takes the dead Cassell's seat, playing cards with the two Jesuses.

Cast

Production
The film is an adaptation of The Three Christs of Ypsilanti, Rokeach's 1964 book-length psychiatric case study of three patients whose paranoid schizophrenic delusions cause each of them to believe he is Jesus Christ.

Three Christs began filming in New York in the summer of 2016. Three short scenes, shot in downtown Ypsilanti, were included in the film.

Release
The film had its world premiere in the Gala Presentations section at the 2017 Toronto International Film Festival. It was released in theaters and on VOD by IFC Films on January 10, 2020. It was released on Shout Factory on June 16, 2020.

Reception

Critical response 
On the review aggregator Rotten Tomatoes, the film holds an approval rating of 43% based on 51 reviews, with an average rating of 5.3/10. The website's critics consensus reads, "Three Christs is far from an unholy mess, but this fact-based drama forsakes its talented cast with a disappointingly facile treatment of genuinely interesting themes." On Metacritic, the film has a weighted average score of 39 out of 100, based on 13 critics, indicating "generally unfavorable reviews".

References

External links

2017 films
2017 drama films
American films based on actual events
American drama films
Drama films based on actual events
Films about schizophrenia
Films based on non-fiction books
Films directed by Jon Avnet
Films scored by Jeff Russo
Films set in Michigan
Films set in psychiatric hospitals
Films shot in New York (state)
IFC Films films
2010s English-language films
2010s American films